Chhadakhai is a ritual of Odisha celebrated on the next day of Kartik Purnima . Kartik month is considered a pious month and a lot of people do not consume non-veg food during this month . Chhadakhai word means having some food after a duration . Since people do not consume non-veg for the whole month of Kartik, they like to consume non-veg food on the very next day, Kartik month ends .

Historically, the ritual began with the Bali Jatra festivities . As per the old Spice Route records, the wind changed its direction around this time . So the sailors, fishermen and traders set out for their voyage during this time . The farewell to the sailors, fishermen and traders were celebrated with a big feast constituting a lot of varieties of non-veg food . During mid-November the meat used to be better and the fish would move towards the coast . Many historians feel this could be the beginning of the ritual .

References

Odisha